Synod of Tyre may refer to:

 The First Synod of Tyre, in 335, which judged the cause of St. Athanasius
 The Second Synod of Tyre, in 449, which dealt with the cause of Ibas, Bishop of Edessa.
 The Third Synod of Tyre, in 514 or 515, which rejected the Council of Chalcedon.